Vlasák (feminine Vlasáková) is a Czech surname denoting a person with a large amount of hair. Notable people include:
 Hana Vlasáková, Czech volleyball player
 Jerry Vlasak, American surgeon
 Lavínia Vlasak, Brazilian actress
 Lenka Vlasáková, Czech actress
 Oldřich Vlasák, Czech politician
 Oldřich Vlasák (wrestler), Czech wrestler
 Tomáš Vlasák, Czech ice hockey player

Wlassak is a Germanized version of the surname.
 Rudolf Wlassak, Austrian physiologist

Czech-language surnames